Oleksandr Tkachenko (born 19 February 1993) is a Ukrainian professional footballer who plays as a goalkeeper.

Career
Tkachenko is a product of the FC Vidradnyi Kyiv and FC Dynamo Kyiv youth sportive systems.

He spent his career in the Ukrainian Premier League Reserves club FC Dynamo Kyiv. In June 2013 Tkachenko signed a contract with FC Vorskla in the Ukrainian Premier League. He made his debut for Vorskla Poltava in the Ukrainian Premier League in a match against FC Shakhtar Donetsk on 9 August 2015.

References

External links 
 Profile on FFU site 
 
 Зірки УПЛ: Олександр Ткаченко  at The Ukrainian Premier League

1993 births
Living people
People from Ukrayinka
Ukrainian footballers
FC Dynamo Kyiv players
Association football goalkeepers
Ukrainian Premier League players
Ukrainian First League players
FC Vorskla Poltava players
FC Hirnyk-Sport Horishni Plavni players
Sportspeople from Kyiv Oblast
Ukraine youth international footballers
Ukraine under-21 international footballers